Count René d'Astorg, born on 29 October 1860 and died in Pau on 28 December 1940, is a French Pyreneist.

Biography 
His family descended from an old Spanish family, long established in Guyenne, settled in Pau. He studied law and very early on became passionate about exploring the Pyrenees.

Linked with Count Henry Russell and with Henri Brulle and Roger de Monts, the pioneers of "The difficulty Pyreneism", he achieved many firsts:

The library of Pau keeps the manuscript of his diary (1885).

References 

French mountain climbers
Pyrénéistes
1860 births
1940 deaths